Cetraria is a genus of fruticose lichens that associate with green algae as photobionts. Most species are found at high latitudes, occurring on sand or heath. Species have a characteristic "strap-like" form, with spiny lobe edges.

Cetraria islandica, Iceland moss, is one of the few culinary lichens, ground and eaten by Northern Europeans in times of famine.

Another species is used today as a "bulking" agent in garam masala of traditional Indian cuisine.

Species
Cetraria aculeata 
Cetraria arenaria 
Cetraria australiensis 
Cetraria corrugata 
Cetraria endochrysea 
Cetraria ericetorum 
Cetraria flavonigrescens 
Cetraria isidiigera 
Cetraria islandica 
Cetraria kamczatica 
Cetraria laevigata 
Cetraria minuscula 
Cetraria muricata  
Cetraria nigricans 
Cetraria odontella 
Cetraria racemosa 
Cetraria sepincola 
Cetraria sinensis 
Cetraria wangii 
Cetraria weii 

The species once known as Cetraria subscutata  was placed into synonymy with Nephromopsis chlorophylla.

References

Gallery

Parmeliaceae
Lichen genera
Taxa named by Erik Acharius
Lecanorales genera
Taxa described in 1803